This is a bibliography of selected publications on the history of Australia.

Reference books
 Barker, Anthony. What Happened When: A Chronology of Australia from 1788. Allen & Unwin. 2000. online edition
 Bambrick, Susan ed. The Cambridge Encyclopedia of Australia (1994)
 Barker, Anthony. What Happened When: A Chronology of Australia from 1788. Allen & Unwin. 2000. online edition
 Basset, Jan. The Oxford Illustrated Dictionary of Australian History (1998)
  online at OUP also excerpt and text search
 Day, Alan.  Historical Dictionary of the Discovery and Exploration of Australia. Scarecrow, 2003. 321 pp.
 Docherty, J. C. Historical Dictionary of Australia (2007) (2001);
 Galligan, Brian, and Winsome Roberts, eds. Oxford Companion to Australian Politics (2007); online at many academic libraries
 
 O'Shane, Pat  et al. Australia: The Complete Encyclopedia (2001)
 Serle. Percival, ed. Dictionary of Australian Biography (1949) online edition
 Shaw, John, ed. Collins Australian Encyclopedia (1984)
 Taylor, Peter. The Atlas of Australian History (1991)
 The Year-book of the Imperial Institute of the United Kingdom, the colonies and India: a statistical record of the resources and trade of the colonial and Indian possessions of the British Empire (2nd. ed. 1893) 880pp; Australia  = pp 521–718  online edition

Surveys
 Atkinson, Alan.  The Europeans in Australia: A History. Vol. 2: Democracy. (2005). 440 pp.
 Basset, Jan. The Oxford Illustrated Dictionary of Australian History (1998)
 Bolton, Geoffrey. The Oxford History of Australia: Volume 5: 1942–1995. The Middle Way (2005)
 Clark, Manning. A History of Australia 6 vol (Melbourne University Press, 1962, 1968, 1973, 1978, 1981, and 1987)
 Clarke, Frank G.  The History of Australia (2002). online edition
 Day, David. Claiming a Continent: A New History of Australia (2001);
 Hughes, Robert. The Fatal Shore: The Epic of Australia’s Founding (1988). excerpt and text search
 Kingston, Beverley. The Oxford History of Australia: Volume 3: 1860–1900 Glad, Confident Morning (1993)
 Kociumbas, Jan. The Oxford History of Australia: Volume 2: 1770–1860 Possessions (1995)
 Macintyre, Stuart. The Oxford History of Australia: Volume 4: 1901–42, the Succeeding Age (1993)
 Macintyre, Stuart. A Concise History of Australia (2nd. ed. 2009) excerpt and text search 
 Schreuder, Deryck, and Stuart Ward, eds. Australia's Empire  (Oxford History of the British Empire Companion Series) (2008) excerpt and text search
 Welsh, Frank. Australia: A New History of the Great Southern Land (2008)

Journals
 Australian Cultural History (last issue volume 28, 2–3, 2010)
Australian Economic History Review
 Australian Historical Studies
 Australian Journal of Politics and History
 History Australia
 Journal of Australian Colonial History 
 Journal of the Royal Australian Historical Society

Specialty studies
 Alomes, Stephen. A Nation at Last? The Changing Character of Australian Nationalism (1988)
 Atkinson, Alan.  The Europeans in Australia: A History. Vol. 2: Democracy. Oxford U. Pr., 2005. 440 pp.
 
 Crowley; F. K. Australia's Western Third: A History of Western Australia from the First Settlements to Modern Times 1960 online edition
  online at OUP also excerpt and text search
 Day, David. Reluctant Nation: Australia and the Allied Defeat of Japan 1942–45 (1992),
 Goodall, Heather. Invasion to Embassy: Land in Aboriginal Politics in New South Wales, 1770–1972 (Allen&Unwin, 1996)
 Edwards, John. Curtin's Gift: Reinterpreting Australia's Greatest Prime Minister, (2005) online edition
 Hughes, Robert. The Fatal Shore: The Epic of Australia’s Founding (1988).  excerpt and text search
, First World War
 Kingston, Beverley. The Oxford History of Australia: Volume 3: 1860–1900 Glad, Confident Morning (1993)
 Kociumbas, Jan. The Oxford History of Australia: Volume 2: 1770–1860 Possessions (1995)
 Lowe, David. Menzies and the 'Great World Struggle': Australia's Cold War 1948–54  (1999) online edition
 Macintyre, Stuart. The Oxford History of Australia: Volume 4: 1901–42, the Succeeding Age (1993)
 Macintyre, Stuart. A Concise History of Australia (2004)  excerpt and text search
 McLachlan, Noel. Waiting for the Revolution: A History of Australian Nationalism (1989)
 Martin, A. W. Robert Menzies: A Life (2 vol 1993–99), online at ACLS e-books
 Reynolds, Henry. The Other Side of the Frontier: Aboriginal Resistance to the European Invasion of Australia (1990).
  Ward, Smart. Australia and the British Embrace: The Demise of the Imperial Ideal (2001)

Recent political history (since 1939)

 Aulich, Chris, ed. From Abbott to Turnbull: A New Direction?  (Echo, 2016) excerpt
 Bolton, Geoffrey. The Oxford History of Australia: Volume 5: 1942–1995. The Middle Way (2005)
 Edwards, John. Curtin's Gift: Reinterpreting Australia's Greatest Prime Minister, (2005) online edition
 Evans, Mark et al. eds. From Turnbull to Morrison: Understanding the Trust Divide (2019) excerpt

 Kelly, Paul. The End of Certainty: Power, Politics & Business in Australia (2008); originally published as The End of Certainty: The Story of the 1980s (1994)

 McDougall, Derek. "From Malcolm Turnbull to ScoMo: crisis for the centre-right in Australia." The Round Table 107.5 (2018): 557-570.
 Manning, Paddy. Born to rule: the unauthorised biography of Malcolm Turnbull (Melbourne Univ. Publishing, 2015).

 Martin, A. W. Robert Menzies: A Life (2 vol 1993–99), online at ACLS e-books
 Megalogenis, George. The Longest Decade (2nd ed. 2009), politics 1990–2008
 Moran, Anthony. Australia: Nation, Belonging, and Globalization Routledge, 2004 online edition

 Turnbull, Malcolm. Fighting for the Republic (Hardie Grant Books, 1999).
 Walsh, Mary, et al. The Revolving Door of Australian Prime Ministers (Melbourne University Press, 2019).
 Weinert, Kim D., and Kieran Tranter. "The empty centre: The Hollowmen and representations of techno-political elites in Australian public life." Entertainment and Sports Law Journal, (2020) 18: 11, pp. 1–9. DOI: https://doi.org/10.16997/eslj.268ESLJ online; argues that the 2008–2009 Australian Broadcasting Corporation (ABC) comedy "The Hollowmen" unveils an empty centre within the nation's public life.

Diplomacy and military

 Australian War Memorial. Encyclopedia online with scores of topics
 Bou, Jean. Light Horse: A History of Australia's Mounted Arm (Australian Army History Series) (2009)
 Bridge, Carl ed., Munich to Vietnam: Australia's Relations with Britain and the United States since the 1930s, Melbourne University Press 1991
 Dennis, Peter, Jeffrey Grey, Ewan Morris, and Robin Prior. The Oxford Companion to Australian Military History. 1996)
 Firth, Stewart. Australia in International Politics: An Introduction to Australian Foreign Policy (2005) online edition
  Grant, Ian. A Dictionary of Australian Military History – from Colonial Times to the Gulf War (1992)
 Gyngell; Allan, and Michael Wesley.  Making Australian Foreign Policy (Cambridge University Press, 2003) online
 Lee, David. Search for Security: The Political Economy of Australia's Postwar Foreign and Defence Policy (1995)
 Lowe, David. Menzies and the 'Great World Struggle': Australia's Cold War 1948–54  (1999) online edition
 McLean, David. "From British Colony to American Satellite? Australia and the USA during the Cold War," Australian Journal of Politics & History (2006) 52 (1), 64–79. Rejects satellite model. online at Blackwell-Synergy
 McLean, David. "Australia in the Cold War: a Historiographical Review." International History Review (2001) 23(2): 299–321. 
 Millar, T. B. Australia in peace and war : external relations 1788-1977 (1978) online, 612pp

 Murphy, John. Harvest of Fear: A History of Australia's Vietnam War (1993)
 Watt, Alan. The Evolution of Australian Foreign Policy 1938–1965, Cambridge University Press, 1967

Second World War
 "Second World War Official Histories" 22 vol 1952–77; online

Homefront
 Hasluck, Paul The Government and the People, 1939–41 (1965) online vol 1; The Government and the People, 1942–45 (1970) online vol 2
 Blum, Timothy. "Profits Over Patriotism: Black Market Crime in World War II Sydney." (2011). online
 Butlin, S.J.  War Economy, 1939–42 (1955) online
 Butlin, S.J.  and C.B. Schedvin, War Economy 1942–1945, (1977) online
 Darian-Smith, Kate. On the Home Front: Melbourne in Wartime, 1939–1945. Australia: Oxford UP, 1990.
 Fort, Carol. "Regulating the labour market in Australia's wartime democracy." Australian Historical Studies 34.122 (2003): 213–230.
 Goot, Murray. "Labor's 1943 landslide: Political market research, Evatt, and the public opinion polls." Labour History: A Journal of Labour and Social History 107 (2014): 149–166. in JSTOR
 McKernan, Michael. Australia During the Second World War: All In! (Nelson, 1983).
 Mellor, D.P. The Role of Science and Industry (1958) online
 Saunders, Kay. War on the Homefront: State Intervention in Queensland, 1938–1948 (1993)
 Saunders, Kay. "The dark shadow of white Australia: racial anxieties in Australia in World War II." Ethnic and Racial Studies 17#2 (1994): 325–341.
 Saunders, Kay. "‘The stranger in our gates’: Internment policies in the United Kingdom and Australia during the two world wars, 1914–39." Immigrants & Minorities 22#1 (2003): 22–43.
 Spear, Jonathan A. "Embedded: the Australian Red Cross in the Second World War." (2007). online
 Willis, Ian C. "The women's voluntary services, a study of war and volunteering in Camden, 1939–1945." (2004). online

Economics, business and labour
 Bramble, Tom. Trade Unionism in Australia: A History from Flood to Ebb Tide (2008) excerpt and text search
 Clark, Victor S. "Australian Economic Problems. I. The Railways," Quarterly Journal of Economics, Vol. 22, No. 3 (May, 1908), pp. 399–451 in JSTOR, history to 1907
 Collins, Jock, and Jock Collins. A shop full of dreams: Ethnic small business in Australia (Pluto Press Australia, 1995).
 Cooper, Rae, and Bradon Ellem. "The neoliberal state, trade unions and collective bargaining in Australia." British Journal of Industrial Relations 46.3 (2008): 532-554.
 Dyster, Barrie, and David Meredith. Australia in the global economy: continuity and change (Cambridge UP, 2012) except.

 Fleming, Grant, David Merrett, and Simon Ville. The big end of town: Big business and corporate leadership in twentieth-century Australia (Cambridge University Press, 2004). excerpt, comprehensive history of corporate life since 1850s.

 Hearn, Mark, Harry Knowles, and Ian Cambridge. One Big Union: A History of the Australian Workers Union 1886–1994 (1998)
 Kirk, Neville. Labour and the Politics of Empire: Britain and Australia, 1900 to the Present(2011).

 Merrett, David T., and Simon Ville. "Financing growth: new issues by Australian firms, 1920–1939." Business History Review 83.3 (2009): 563-589. online
 Merrett, David, and Simon Ville. "Tariffs, Subsidies, And Profits: A Re‐Assessment Of Structural Change In Australia 1901–39." Australian Economic History Review 51.1 (2011): 46-70. online
 Milton-Smith, John. "Business ethics in Australia and New Zealand." Journal of Business ethics 16.14 (1997): 1485-1497.

 Nielsen, James F., Chris Terry, and Rowan M. Trayler. "Business banking in Australia: a comparison of expectations." International Journal of Bank Marketing (1998).
 Panza, Laura, Simon Ville, and David Merrett. "The drivers of firm longevity: Age, size, profitability and survivorship of Australian corporations, 1901–1930." Business History 60.2 (2018): 157-177. online

 Rafferty, Mike, and Serena Yu. Shifting risk: work and working life in Australia: a report for the Australian Council of Trade Unions (University of Sydney, Workplace Research Centre, 2010) online.

 Ville, Simon, and David Tolmie Merrett. "Investing in a Wealthy Resource-Based Colonial Economy: International Business in Australia before World War I." Business History Review 94.2 (2020): 321-346. online

 Wright, Chris F., and Russell D. Lansbury. "Trade unions and economic reform in Australia, 1983–2013." Singapore Economic Review 59.04 (2014): online

Culture, society, race, ethnicity, gender
 Arrow, Michelle. Friday on our minds: popular culture in Australia since 1945 (UNSW Press, 2009).
 Babatunde-Sowole, Olutoyin O., et al. "'Coming to a Strange Land' The West African Migrant Women’s Establishment of Home and Family in a New Culture Within Australia." Journal of Transcultural Nursing 27.5 (2016): 447-455. online

 Bennett, Bruce et al. The Oxford Literary History of Australia (1999)
 Bennett, Tony, and David Carter. Culture in Australia: Policies, Publics and Programs (2001) excerpt and text search
 Carey, Hilary. Believing in Australia: A Cultural History of Religions (1996).
 Collins, Jock, and Jock Collins. A shop full of dreams: Ethnic small business in Australia (Pluto Press Australia, 1995).

 Crawford, Robert. "Selling modernity: advertising and the construction of the culture of consumption in Australia, 1900-1950." ACH: The Journal of the History of Culture in Australia 24-25 (2006).

 Fiske, John, Bob Hodge, and Graeme Turner. Myths of Oz: reading Australian popular culture (Routledge, 2016).

 Harris, Anita. "In a Girlie World: Tweenies in Australia." Counterpoints 245 (2005): 209-223. online

 Kapferer, Bruce. Legends of people, myths of state: violence, intolerance, and political culture in Sri Lanka and Australia (Berghahn Books, 2011).
 Kleinert, Sylvia. and Margo Neale. The Oxford Companion to Aboriginal Art and Culture (2001)
 Moran, Albert. Historical Dictionary of Australian Radio and Television (2007)

 O'Brien, Patricia. "Remaking Australia's Colonial Culture?: White Australia and its Papuan Frontier 1901–1940." Australian Historical Studies 40.1 (2009): 96-112.
 Peppard, Judith. "Culture wars in South Australia: the sex education debates." Australian Journal of Social Issues 43.3 (2008): 499-516.

 Rutland, Suzanne D. The Jews in Australia (Cambridge University Press, 2006).

 Schneider, Tanja, and Teresa Davis. "Advertising food in Australia: Between antinomies and gastro‐anomy." Consumption, Markets and Culture 13.1 (2010): 31-41 online.

 Skinner, Natalie, and Barbara Pocock. "Work, life, flexibility and workplace culture in Australia: results of the 2008 Australian Work and Life Index (AWALI) Survey." Australian Bulletin of Labour 36.2 (2010): 133-154.
 Staniforth, Mark. Material culture and consumer society: dependent colonies in colonial Australia (Springer Science & Business Media, 2012).

 Stratton, Jon. Uncertain lives: Culture, race and neoliberalism in Australia (Cambridge Scholars Publishing, 2011).
 Ward, Stuart. "The “new nationalism” in Australia, Canada and New Zealand: Civic culture in the wake of the British world." in Britishness abroad: Transnational movements and imperial cultures (2007) pp: 231-36.

 Webby, Elizabeth, ed. The Cambridge Companion to Australian Literature (2006)

Environment and geography
 Bolton, Geoffrey. Spoils and Spoilers: Australians Make Their Environment, 1788–1980 (Sydney, Allen & Unwin, 1981).
 Cathcart, Michael. The water dreamers: the remarkable history of our dry continent (2010) online review.

 Doyle, Timothy, and Tsarina Doyle. Green power: the environment movement in Australia (UNSW Press, 2000).
 Dunlap, Thomas R. Nature and the English Diaspora: Environment and History in the United States, Canada, Australia, and New Zealand (Studies in Environment and History) (1999)
 Frost, Lionel, and Seamus O'Hanlon. "Urban history and the future of Australian cities." Australian Economic History Review 49.1 (2009): 1-18. online
 Garden, Donald S., and Mark R. Stoll. Australia, New Zealand, and the Pacific: An Environmental History (Nature and Human Societies) (2005)

 Howes, Michael. Politics and the Environment: Risk and the Role of Government and Industry (Routledge, 2013) compares Britain, USA and Australia.
 Hutton, Drew, and Libby Connors. History of the Australian Environment Movement (1999) excerpt and text search
 Lines, William J. Taming the Great South Land: A History of the Conquest of Nature in Australia (1999)

 Powell, J. M. Watering the Garden State: Water, Land and Community in Victoria 1834–1988 (Sydney, Allen & Unwin, 1989).
 Pyne, Stephen J. Burning Bush: A Fire History of Australia (Holt, 1991) excerpt.

 Robin, Libby. "Australia in global environmental history" in A Companion to Global Environmental History Edited by J. R. McNeill and Erin Stewart Mauldin. (Wiley-Blackwell, 2012) pp 182–195.online.
 Robin, Libby. Defending the Little Desert: The Rise of Ecological Consciousness in Australia (Melbourne University Press, 1998).
 Rolls, E. They All Ran Wild: The Animals and Plants that Plague Australia (Angus and Robertson, 1969).
 Seddon, George. Landprints: Reflections on Place and Landscape (Melbourne, Cambridge U Press, 1997) excerpt
 Tranter, Bruce. "Environmental activists and non-active environmentalists in Australia." Environmental Politics 19.3 (2010): 413-429.
 Tranter, Bruce. "Leadership and change in the Tasmanian environment movement." Leadership Quarterly 20.5 (2009): 708-724 online
 Williams, Michael. The Making of the South Australian Landscape (Academic Press , 1974).
 Wright, R. The Bureaucrat ’s Domain: Space and the Public Interest in Victoria 1836–1884, (Melbourne, Oxford University Press , 1989).

Historiography

 Attwood, Bain, and Fiona Magowan. Telling Stories: Indigenous History and Memory in Australia and New Zealand (2001) online edition
 Bongiorno, Frank. "'Real Solemn History' and Its Discontents: Australian Political History and the Challenge of Social History," Australian Journal of Politics and History (2010) 56#1 pp 6+ online edition 
 Bonnell, Andrew G.  and Martin Crotty,  "An Australian 'Historikerstreit'? Review Article," Australian Journal of Politics & History (2004) 50#3 pp 425–433
 Case, Jo. "Who Killed Australian History?" In History (6 March 2012) online
 Coombes, Annie E. Rethinking Settler Colonialism: History and Memory in Australia, Canada, New Zealand and South Africa (Studies in Imperialism) (2006)
 Davison, Graeme. The Use and Abuse of Australian History (2000) online edition
 Gare, Deborah. "Britishness in recent Australian historiography." Historical Journal 43#4 (2000): 1145–1155.
 Hirst, John, and Stuart Macintyre, eds, The Oxford Companion to Australian History (Melbourne, 1998); many articles have a historiographical component
 McIntyre, Stuart. The History Wars (2nd ed. 2004) see History wars article
 McIntyre, Stuart, and Julian Thomas, eds, The Discovery of Australian History 1890–1939 (Carlton, Vic., 1995)
 McLean, David. "Australia in the Cold War: A Historiographical Review", The International History Review, Vol. 23, 2 (June 2001)
 McQueen, Humphrey. Gallipoli to Petrov: Arguing with Australian History (1984),
 Meaney, Neville. "Britishness and Australian Identity: The Problem of Nationalism in Australian History and Historiography", Australian Historical Studies, Vol. 32, 116 (April 2001),
 Nugent, Maria. Botany Bay: Where Histories Meet (2005) online edition
 Waterhouse, Richard. "Locating the New Social History: transnational historiography and Australian local history", Journal of the Royal Australian Historical Society (2009) 95#1 pp. 1–17.

Primary sources
 Kemp, Rod, and Marion Stanton, eds. Speaking for Australia: Parliamentary Speeches That Shaped Our Nation Allen & Unwin, 2004 online edition
 Crowley, Frank, ed.  Modern Australia in documents, volume 1, 1901–1939 (1973); Modern Australia in Documents, 1939–1970'' (1973) Wren Publishing, Melbourne.

References

Australia
Australia
Historiography of Australia